Yuliya Anatolyevna Vetlova (born October 18, 1983 in Kandalaksha) is a Russian luger who has competed since 1999. A natural track luger, she won the silver medal in the women's singles event at the 2007 FIL World Luge Natural Track Championships in Grande Prairie, Alberta, Canada.

References
FIL-Luge profile (as Julia Vetlova)
Natural track World Championships results: 1979–2007

External links
 

1983 births
Living people
Russian female lugers